Laabi is a village in Harku Parish, Harju County in northern Estonia.

The eastern half of the village's territory is covered by the Harku limestone rubble quarry. In the western part there are several industrial enterprises including alcohol producer Altia and Tallegg's chicken farm. There's also a kart circuit.

Laabi has a population of 88 (as of 1 June 2010).

References

Villages in Harju County